McLean School (formerly the McLean School of Maryland) is a K-12 co-educational, college preparatory school located in Potomac, Maryland.

History

Founded in 1954 by Lenore and Delbert Foster, McLean School is an independent, coeducational, college preparatory day school for bright students in kindergarten through grade 12. The school got its name after the McLean Gardens in Northwest Washington, D.C. as it was started on the ground floor of one of the original buildings. The school was forced to move to its current location when the demand for housing in the area grew.

Athletics
McLean students participate in the following varsity sports: basketball, cross country, baseball, lacrosse, soccer, softball, track and field, volleyball, and wrestling.

Students compete in the Potomac Valley Athletic Conference.

References

External links 

Private high schools in Maryland
Private middle schools in Maryland
Private elementary schools in Maryland
Schools in Montgomery County, Maryland
Preparatory schools in Maryland
Educational institutions established in 1954
1954 establishments in Maryland